Yulia Leonidovna Latynina (born 16 June 1966) is an independent journalist, writer, TV and radio host from Russia. She grew famous as a columnist for Novaya Gazeta and was the most popular host at the Echo of Moscow radio station for years.

Yulia Latynina is a prolific writer, she has written more than twenty books, including fantasy and crime fiction.

Biography

Family and education 

Yulia Latynina was born in Moscow on 16 June 1966. Her father is writer Leonid Latynin and her mother is literary critic Alla Latynina.

Yulia Latynina studied philology at the Maxim Gorky Literature Institute from 1983 to 1988. In 1993, under the scientific supervision of Professor Vyacheslav Ivanov she defended her PhD at the Gorky Institute of World Literature.

Journalistic career
Latynina started her journalistic career as an economic columnist. She worked for periodicals Segodnya (1995–96), Izvestia (1996–97), Expert (1997–98), Sovershenno Secretno (1999–2000), and others. By 2000, Latynina already had a reputation as one of the leading journalists in the field of economics. In 2001 she became a columnist for Novaya Gazeta. In the same year, she was invited to host ‘Rublevaya Zona’, an analytical programme on NTV. The show started her Tv career. In 2003, it was followed by an analytical programm “24” that was broadcast on REN TV.

Later, Latynina worked for Ezhednevny Zhurnal (2005–15) and Gazeta.ru (2006–2013). She also worked for television channels NTV (2000–01), ORT (2001–02), TVS (2002–03) and REN TV (2003–04). In 2003 Latynina started hosting the show Access Code at a radio station Echo of Moscow.

In 2007, Italian newspaper Corriere della Sera named her best foreign journalist in an award ceremony dedicated to Maria Grazia Cutuli.

In 2008, Latynina received the Freedom Defenders Award from the United States Department of State. She received the award from Condoleezza Rice, who praised the journalist for her achievements:

Views

Yulia Latynina is known for her sharp and polemic statements. She proclaims herself a libertarian.

For some time she openly denied global warming and called Michael E. Mann's hockey stick graph a fake. However, in 2022 Latynina agreed that "global warming is real".

Latynina was a member of the Committee 2008.

She voiced an opinion that universal suffrage was bad for poor countries. She also criticized western liberalism and human rights organizations which she thinks are used by Muslim extremists as useful idiots to prevent winning the War on Terror.

In her opinion, Moscow Helsinki Group was wrong in supporting Russian scientist Igor Sutyagin, who she suggested could actually be involved in espionage. She argued that although communications of Sutyagin with foreign spy agencies have never been proven, the foreign agency that he passed information on was indeed highly suspicious.

Latynina has been a consistent critic of leftist politics. In September 2020, she said: "I. e, the owners of Sargon-like countries are witnessing the same propaganda, a similar technology of total lies combined with socialism and leftist ideas. It penetrates all the structures of Western society... Here, the USSR used to be creating socialism for everyone, and, in the United States, the politicians were a lot smarter. Even those with the left [political] orientation have been creating socialism only for the poor".

Attacks

In retaliation for her political stance and categorical statements, Latynina became a victim of several attacks. On August 20, 2016, she was assaulted by two men in motorcycle helmets who poured feces on her. On the night of 18 and 19 July 2017, unknown assailants attacked Latynina's house and sprayed it with a very pungent and caustic type of gas of unknown composition. Along with herself, 8 people were additionally injured in the gas attack, including four elderly people and two children. She said that she would not bring the case to the officials as police had not investigated some attacks on opposition politicians, however, Dmitry Muratov reported the attack to the police.

On 2 September, Latynina's car was set on fire. The investigator said that "the car caught fire by itself". On 9 September, Latynina announced that she and her family are leaving Russia and would not return "in the near future". She called the car's arson an attempted murder. According to her father, Latynina had been under surveillance for some time, and the attackers were not bandits but an organized group that received commands from certain influential people.

In emigration 

In 2022, Latynina joined the Anti-war committee. She has been a member of the Anti-War Committee of Russia since February 2022. In September of the same year, she was included in the Russian list of foreign agents.

Writing career

Latynina published her first novel in 1990. For some time she used a pen-name Eugene Klimovich, however, most subsequent printings were issued under the author's real name. She works in the genre of sharp detective-adventure prose on Russian material as well as in fiction. Later she was nominated to the National Bestseller literary prize, as well as the Russian Booker and several others. The total print run of Yulia Latynina's books from 1999-2000 has exceeded 500,000 copies.

See also
 List of Russian-language novelists

References

External links

  
 Youtube chanel in Russian of Yulia Latynina
 telegram chanel in Russian of Yulia Latynina
 twiter in Russian of Yulia Latynina
 chanel in Russian of Yulia Latynina
 Официальный сайт Юлии Латыниной
 Biography
 Yulia Latynina at the Wilson Center
 Yulia Latynina at The Moscow Times
 Yulia Latynina at Novaya Gazeta 
 Yulia Latynina at Echo of Moscow 

1966 births
Living people
20th-century Russian novelists
20th-century Russian women writers
21st-century Russian novelists
21st-century Russian women writers
Echo of Moscow radio presenters
Russian investigative journalists
Russian fantasy writers
Russian political scientists
Russian science fiction writers
Russian women journalists
Russian women novelists
Russian women columnists
Women radio journalists
Women science fiction and fantasy writers
Writers from Moscow
Women political scientists
Maxim Gorky Literature Institute alumni
Russian activists against the 2022 Russian invasion of Ukraine
People listed in Russia as foreign agents
Free Media Awards winners
Russian libertarians
Russian emigrants to the United States
Russian exiles